Eilema cretacea is a moth of the subfamily Arctiinae first described by George Hampson in 1911. It is found in Sikkim, India.

References

Moths described in 1911
cretacea